Wesley Vissers (born May 6, 1993) is a Dutch IFBB professional bodybuilder.

Early life 
Wesley Vissers was born in the Netherlands during the spring of 1993 in the city of Oosterhout. He began lifting weights at age 14 after being inspired by his father. Vissers studied Nutrition & Dietetics at HAN University of Applied Sciences.

Career

Amateur career 
Wesley Vissers' first competition was the 2013 Flexcup where he placed first overall in the junior division. He then followed that result up the next year by taking first overall in the open division of the same show. That same year he also claimed first overall in the junior division of the 2014 Juliette Bergmann Grand Prix.

After a two-year gap between competitions Vissers returned to the stage in 2016 to compete in the European Arnold Classic. Here he placed fifth overall in the junior division.

Vissers followed this performance in the 2016 Juliette Bergman Grand Prix where he placed first overall amongst the junior division and second overall in super heavy-weight division. The next year he placed first overall in the 2017 Juliette Bergman Grand Prix open division.

In 2017, Vissers entered and took first overall in the classic division of Royal London Pro qualifier. Here he earned his IFBB pro card officially making him a professional bodybuilder.

Professional career 
In 2018, Vissers traveled to the United States to enter his first IFBB professional competition, the 2018 Chicago Pro. Here he placed first overall amongst 18 men in the classic division to claim his invitation to the 2018 Mr. Olympia competition.

In the 2018 Mr. Olympia, Vissers went head to head with the top classic physique athletes in the world including the previous year's top two of Breon Ansley and Chris Bumstead. Vissers would finish a tied 16th place among the 26 competitors. 

Vissers returned to the stage the following year in the 2019 Arnold Classic. Here he placed outside of the top 6 in the classic physique division. Vissers skipped the 2019 Mr. Olympia competition, but returned to the Classic Physique pro stage later the same year at the 2019 IFBB Romania Pro, which he won, securing his 2020 Mr. Olympia qualification.

The following years Vissers went on to win 2021 IFBB Poland Pro and 2022 IFBB France Pro, proving himself to be a consistent elite level performer in the Men's Classic Physique.

Contest history 

 1st - FlexCup, 2013, Junior Division, Veldhoven, Netherlands
 1st - FlexCup, 2014, Open Division, Veldhoven, Netherlands
 2nd - Ironman & Ironmaiden, 2014, Junior Division, Sommelsdijk, Netherlands
 1st - Juliette Bergman Grand Prix, 2014, Junior Division, Sommelsdijk, Netherlands 
 5th - Arnold Classic Europe, 2016, Junior Division, Barcelona, Spain 
 1st - Juliette Bergman Grand Prix, 2016, Junior Division, Hilversum, Netherlands
 1st - Mr Golden Era, 2017, NSP Online Competition 
 4th - Pepa Grand Prix, 2017, Open Division, Opava, Czech Republic
 1st - Juliette Bergman Grand Prix, 2017, Open Division, Hilversum, Netherlands
 1st - Royal London Pro, 2018, Classic Physique, London, England (earned IFBB pro card) 
 1st - Chicago Pro, 2018, Classic Physique, Chicago, Illinois
 16th - Mr Olympia, 2018, Classic Physique, Las Vegas, Nevada 
 10th - Arnold Classic, 2019, Classic Physique, Columbus, Ohio
 1st - Romania Muscle Fest Pro, 2019, Classic Physique, Bucharest, Romania
 11th - Mr Olympia, 2020, Classic Physique, Orlando, Florida
 3rd - Mr Big Evolution Pro Portugal, 2021, Classic Physique, Estorl, Portugal
 1st - Battle of Champions Pro Poland, 2021, Classic Physique, Warsaw, Poland
 11th - Mr Olympia, 2021, Classic Physique, Orlando, Florida
 3rd - Arnold Classic UK, 2022, Classic Physique, Birmingham, England
 1st - Yamamoto Pro Cup France, 2022, Classic Physique, Lille, France
 8th - Mr Olympia, 2022, Classic Physique, Las Vegas, Nevada

Vintage Genetics 
Wesley Vissers along with his family founded and run the Vintage Genetics brand. They offer bodybuilding inspired clothing, footwear, training gear, and online personal coaching. In 2017 Vintage Genetics worked together with Nutritech to produce a bodybuilding supplement line. As of 2019, the owner of Vintage Genetics, Wesley Vissers, has started his own supplement line named Gladiator Sports Pro of which each supplement is personally formulated by Vissers himself.

Personal life 
Wesley Vissers's is living in Best, Netherlands. His girlfriend, former judoka Marly Nooijen, is the owner of 100% FitGym, the gym that Vissers has used since late 2017 to work for the achievement of his IFBB Pro card, his IFBB Pro League Win and every other accomplishment thereafter. The gym is located in Best, the Netherlands and is also used to accommodate coaching and posing lessons for eager bodybuilders. Wesley Vissers also has a younger brother named Kane who is an aspiring amateur bodybuilder. Vissers and his girlfriend has a son named Dexter. And a daughter named Lara.

References 

Dutch bodybuilders
1993 births
Living people